Róisín Smyth (also known as Roisin Smyth) (born 26 October 1963) is a middle-distance runner from County Londonderry in Northern Ireland. Her focus areas were cross-country and 3,000 m on the track. She competed in the 3000 m heats at the 1984 Summer Olympics, the 1991 World Championships as well as at six World Cross Country championships. She was all-Ireland 3000 m champion on three occasions, and once at 1500 m. Smyth competed in the World Cross Country Championships for both Northern Ireland and Ireland.

International competitions

Personal life
Smyth is married to Enda Fitzpatrick. He is a fellow world cross country athlete and is the director of Dublin City University's sports academy. They have two daughters, both of whom are accomplished athletes at national level.

References

1963 births
Living people
Female middle-distance runners from Northern Ireland
Athletes (track and field) at the 1984 Summer Olympics
Alumni of University College Dublin
Sportspeople from County Londonderry
Olympic athletes of Ireland